Negitoro is a Japanese cuisine of minced raw tuna scrape, the fatty parts of the fish that cannot be made into other meals, commonly served together with green onion. In addition to being an ingredient to sushi of various types, they are also used as a rice bowl topping, forming negitorodon.

Etymology 
Multiple hypotheses exist.

Combination of green onion and toro part of tuna

Toro referring to something other than part of tuna

Negi referring to something other than green onion
In the field of construction in Japan, digging soil from the ground to constructing building is termed negiru, and it was hypothesized that the term adopted into negiru or negitoru to refer to meat being scraped. Tuna fishing groups support the hypothesis. However, dictionary editors question the hypothesis, claiming there is no verifiable usage of the verb form of the adopted word negitoru, and thus the hypothesis cannot be sustained.

Mass-market product
Negitoro sold to the mass market and distributed into retail channels like supermarkets is mass-produced in fish factories. They use lean meat of various fishes, including, for example, yellowfin tuna, marlin, bigeye tuna, and albacore,  then adding additives like vegetable oil, shortening, lard, antioxidants, and condiments. Dedicated fat products for the purpose of negitoro manufacturing have also been produced.

Japanese consumer groups and magazines have raised concerns about such practices being possibly misleading and raising potential health concerns. However, there are also claims that unprocessed tuna scrape is not popular.

References

Citations

Bibliography 
 
 
 
 
 
 
 
 
 
 
 
 
 
 
 
 
 
 
 
 
 
 
 
 
 
 
 
 
 
 
 

Tuna dishes
Japanese cuisine
Sushi
Raw foods